(also written 2017 FZ2) is a micro-asteroid and near-Earth object of the Apollo group that was a quasi-satellite of the Earth until March 23, 2017.

Discovery, orbit and physical properties 

 was discovered by American astronomer Gregory Leonard on March 19, 2017, observing for the Mt. Lemmon Survey from Mount Lemmon Observatory. Its orbit is moderately eccentric (0.26), low inclination (1.81º) and a semi-major axis of 1.007 AU. Upon discovery, it was classified as an Apollo asteroid but also an Earth crosser by the Minor Planet Center. Its orbit is very chaotic but it is relatively well determined; as of September 26, 2017, its orbit is based on 52 observations (1 Doppler) spanning a data-arc of 8 days.  has an absolute magnitude of 26.7 which gives a characteristic diameter of 20 m.

Quasi-satellite 

 was until very recently an Earth's coorbital, the sixth known quasi-satellite of our planet and the
smallest by far. Its most recent quasi-satellite episode may have started over 225 years ago and certainly ended after a close
encounter with the Earth on March 23, 2017.

YORP group? 
There is an apparent excess of small bodies moving in orbits similar to that of YORP and this could be the result of mass shedding from YORP.

See also
 Yarkovsky–O'Keefe–Radzievskii–Paddack effect
 1620 Geographos
 1862 Apollo
 25143 Itokawa
 54509 YORP

Notes 

  This is assuming an albedo of 0.20–0.04.

References

External links 
  data at MPC
 MPEC 2017-F65 : 2017 FZ2 (Discovery MPEC)
 
 
 

Minor planet object articles (unnumbered)
Earth-crossing asteroids

20170319